The Solae is an elevator test tower located in the city of Inazawa, Japan. It is owned by Mitsubishi Electric. When completed in 2007, it was the world's tallest elevator test tower. Since that time, the record has been broken by the Hyundai Eizan Tower (205 meters) in 2009, the Hitachi G1 Tower (213 meters) in 2010 and the Kunshan Test Tower in China (235 meters).

References

External links 
 

Mitsubishi Electric
Towers in Japan
Elevator test towers
Inazawa
Buildings and structures in Aichi Prefecture